Siddhartha Law College is a college imparting education in law in Dehradun, Uttarakhand. It was established in the year 2009 and offers a five-year integrated Bachelor of Law (B.A./B.B.A.LL.B) degree, a three-year (LL.B) degree, and a one-year Master of Law (LLM) degree. The college is affiliated with Uttarakhand Technical University.

References

External links 
 https://siddhartha.com

Universities and colleges in Dehradun
Educational institutions established in 2009
2009 establishments in Uttarakhand
Law schools in Uttarakhand